Invincible Shan Bao Mei, also known as I Love Shan Bao Mei and Woody Sambo (我愛珊寶妹), is a 2008 Taiwanese romantic drama series starring Nicholas Teo and Amber Kuo. It premiered on August 24, 2008, right after the half-episode conclusion of Fated to Love You. The peak point of 10.57 occurred during the commercial-free transition from Fated to Love You to Invincible Shan Bao Mei. Its first episode had an average rating of 7.25.

Plot
Sun Wu Di (Nicholas Teo) and his father were kidnapped when Wu Di (which means "Invincible") was still a child. As an adult, it is very hard for him to trust the people around him, despite the fact that he has a girlfriend, Zu An (Hong Xiao Ling). He thinks of himself very highly and very lowly of those around him. Leading a life with no worries and with himself as the only person he can trust, his world gets turned up-side-down when he meets a girl named Hu Shan Bao (Amber Kuo).

Cast
 Nicholas Teo as Sun Wu Di (孫無敵)
 Amber Kuo as Hu Shan Bao (胡珊寶)
 Roy Chiu as Zhang Wei Qing (張唯青)
 Hong Xiao Ling as Ji Zu An (紀祖安) (Sun Wu Di's girlfriend)
 Wang Yi Fei (黃一飛) as Hu Guang (胡廣) (Shan Bao's father)
 Liang He Qun (梁赫群) as Hu Da Dao (胡大刀) (Shan Bao's brother)
 George Zhang (張兆志) as Xiao Sa Ge (瀟灑哥)
 Zhong Xin Ling as Chi Xin Jie (癡心姐)
 Guan Yong (關勇) as Ji Da Wei (紀大偉)
 Tony Fish (余炳賢) as A Xiang (阿牆)
 Chen Han-dian (陳漢典) as Kai Wen (凱文)
 Zhao Zheng Ping (趙正平) as Kidnapper
 Lin Zhi Yan (林智賢) as Kidnapper
 Ethan Juan as Ji Cun Xi (紀存希) (ep 1&2)
 Joe Chen as Chen Xin Yi (陳欣怡) (ep 2)
 Na Wei Xun as Anson (ep 1)
 Jessica Song (宋新妮) as Chen Qing Xia (陳青霞) (ep 1)

Production
After Fated to Love You'''s success, Invincible Shan Bao Mei was launched as its successor. During their guest appearance, Chen Qiao En and Ethan Juan reprise their roles from Fated to Love You as Chen Xin Yi and Ji Cun Xi respectively, as do Na Wei Xun, who plays Anson, and Jessica Song, as Chen Xin Yi's eldest sister Chen Qing Xia''.

Episode Ratings

Source: Chinatimes Showbiz

See also
 Fated to Love You

External links
TTV Official Website
SetTV Official Website

Taiwanese drama television series
2008 Taiwanese television series debuts
Taiwan Television original programming
Sanlih E-Television original programming